is the first studio album by Japanese idol group Hinatazaka46. It was released on September 23, 2020. This album is the second released in the group's history after Hashiridasu Shunkan, which was released under the name Hiragana Keyakizaka46.

History and release 
During a live streamed concert on July 31, 2020, Hinatazaka46 announced that they will be releasing a new album. The album's name, Hinatazaka, was announced on August 18; the name is the group's name written in hiragana.

The album was released in three versions: Type-A, Type-B, and Regular. The first two are bundled with a Blu-ray disk containing the music video of promotional track, and footage from Hinatazaka46's concerts.

Track listing 
All lyrics are written by Yasushi Akimoto, except "Overture".

Type-A

Type-B

Regular edition

Complete edition 
Credits adapted from Apple Music.

Participating members

"Azato Kawaii" 
Center: Mirei Sasaki

 1st row: Kyōko Saitō, Shiho Katō, Mirei Sasaki, Nao Kosaka, Miku Kanemura
 2nd row: Suzuka Tomita, Konoka Matsuda, Hina Kawata, Akari Nibu, Miho Watanabe, Hinano Kamimura, Mei Higashimura, Sarina Ushio
 3rd row: Yūka Kageyama, Mana Takase, Haruyo Yamaguchi, Ayaka Takamoto, Kumi Sasaki, Manamo Miyata, Marī Morimoto, Hiyori Hamagishi, Mikuni Takahashi

"Kono Natsu o Jam ni Shiyō" 
 Hinano Kamimura, Mikuni Takahashi, Marī Morimoto, Haruyo Yamaguchi（3rd Generation Songs）

"Dare yori mo Takaku Tobe! 2020" 
 Sarina Ushio, Yūka Kageyama, Shiho Katō, Kyōko Saitō, Kumi Sasaki, Mirei Sasaki, Mana Takase, Ayaka Takamoto, Mei Higashimura, Miku Kanemura, Hina Kawata, Nao Kosaka, Suzuka Tomita, Akari Nibu, Hiyori Hamagishi, Konoka Matsuda, Manamo Miyata, Miho Watanabe, Hinano Kamimura, Mikuni Takahashi, Marī Morimoto, Haruyo Yamaguchi

"Hinatazaka" 
  Mao Iguchi, Sarina Ushio, Memi Kakizaki, Shiho Katō, Kyōko Saitō, Kumi Sasaki, Mirei Sasaki, Mana Takase, Ayaka Takamoto, Mei Higashimura, Miku Kanemura, Hina Kawata, Nao Kosaka, Suzuka Tomita, Akari Nibu, Hiyori Hamagishi, Konoka Matsuda, Manamo Miyata, Miho Watanabe, Hinano Kamimura

"NO WAR in the future 2020" 
 Sarina Ushio, Yūka Kageyama, Shiho Katō, Kyōko Saitō, Kumi Sasaki, Mirei Sasaki, Mana Takase, Ayaka Takamoto, Mei Higashimura, Miku Kanemura, Hina Kawata, Nao Kosaka, Suzuka Tomita, Akari Nibu, Hiyori Hamagishi, Konoka Matsuda, Manamo Miyata, Miho Watanabe, Hinano Kamimura, Mikuni Takahashi, Marī Morimoto, Haruyo Yamaguchi

"Tada Gamushara ni" 
 Sarina Ushio, Yūka Kageyama, Shiho Katō, Kyōko Saitō, Kumi Sasaki, Mirei Sasaki, Mana Takase, Ayaka Takamoto, Mei Higashimura, Miku Kanemura, Hina Kawata, Nao Kosaka, Suzuka Tomita, Akari Nibu, Hiyori Hamagishi, Konoka Matsuda, Manamo Miyata, Miho Watanabe, Hinano Kamimura, Mikuni Takahashi, Marī Morimoto, Haruyo Yamaguchi

"Dōshite Ame da to Ittan Darō?" 
 Shiho Katō, Kyōko Saitō, Mirei Sasaki

"My Fans" 
 Sarina Ushio, Yūka Kageyama, Shiho Katō, Kyōko Saitō, Kumi Sasaki, Mirei Sasaki, Mana Takase, Ayaka Takamoto, Mei Higashimura, Miku Kanemura, Hina Kawata, Nao Kosaka, Suzuka Tomita, Akari Nibu, Hiyori Hamagishi, Konoka Matsuda, Manamo Miyata, Miho Watanabe, Hinano Kamimura, Mikuni Takahashi, Marī Morimoto, Haruyo Yamaguchi

"See Through" 
 Miku Kanemura, Nao Kosaka

"Yakusoku no Tamago 2020" 
 Sarina Ushio, Yūka Kageyama, Shiho Katō, Kyōko Saitō, Kumi Sasaki, Mirei Sasaki, Mana Takase, Ayaka Takamoto, Mei Higashimura, Miku Kanemura, Hina Kawata, Nao Kosaka, Suzuka Tomita, Akari Nibu, Hiyori Hamagishi, Konoka Matsuda, Manamo Miyata, Miho Watanabe, Hinano Kamimura, Mikuni Takahashi, Marī Morimoto, Haruyo Yamaguchi

Charts

Weekly charts

Year-end charts

Certifications

References 

Hinatazaka46 albums
Japanese-language albums
2020 albums